Rossville is an unincorporated community and census-designated place in Baltimore County, Maryland, United States. The population was 15,147 at the 2010 census.

Geography
Rossville is located at  (39.355897, −76.478732).

Demographics

As of the census of 2000, there were 11,515 people, 4,811 households, and 2,819 families living in the CDP. The racial makeup of the CDP was 70.60% White, 21.88% African American, 0.29% Native American, 4.26% Asian, 0.01% Pacific Islander, 1.24% from other races, and 1.71% from two or more races. Hispanic or Latino of any race were 2.86% of the population.

There were 4,811 households, out of which 30.2% had children under the age of 18 living with them, 40.3% were married couples living together, 13.4% had a female householder with no husband present, and 41.4% were non-families. 31.4% of all households were made up of individuals, and 4.0% had someone living alone who was 65 years of age or older. The average household size was 2.34 and the average family size was 2.98.

In the CDP, the population was spread out, with 23.0% under the age of 18, 11.4% from 18 to 24, 36.7% from 25 to 44, 19.8% from 45 to 64, and 9.1% who were 65 years of age or older. The median age was 32 years. For every 100 females, there were 95.2 males. For every 100 females age 18 and over, there were 91.2 males.

The median income for a household in the CDP was $47,545, and the median income for a family was $57,974. Males had a median income of $37,079 versus $30,006 for females. The per capita income for the CDP was $22,608. About 3.8% of families and 4.9% of the population were below the poverty line, including 4.4% of those under age 18 and 6.0% of those age 65 or over.

References

Census-designated places in Baltimore County, Maryland
Census-designated places in Maryland